Leonela Aleyda Ayoví Parraga (born 7 March 1997) is an Ecuadorian freestyle wrestler. She is a silver and bronze medalist at the Bolivarian Games. She is also a bronze medalist at the Pan American Wrestling Championships.

Career 

In 2012, 2013 and 2014 she won medals at youth and junior levels at both national and international competitions. In 2014, she competed in the women's 70kg event at the Summer Youth Olympics held in Nanjing, China.

She won one of the bronze medals in the women's 58kg event at the 2017 Bolivarian Games held in Santa Marta, Colombia. She won one of the bronze medals in the women's 68kg event at the 2018 Pan American Wrestling Championships held in Lima, Peru. She competed the women's 68kg event at the 2018 South American Games held in Cochabamba, Bolivia.

She competed in the women's 68kg event at the 2019 Pan American Wrestling Championships held in Buenos Aires, Argentina. At the 2019 Pan American Games held in Lima, Peru, she competed in the women's 68kg event.

In 2020, she competed in her event at the Pan American Wrestling Championships held in Ottawa, Canada. She competed at the Pan American Wrestling Olympic Qualification Tournament held in Ottawa, Canada without qualifying for the 2020 Summer Olympics in Tokyo, Japan. She also competed at the 2021 Pan American Wrestling Championships held in Guatemala City, Guatemala and the 2022 Pan American Wrestling Championships held in Acapulco, Mexico.

She won the silver medal in the women's 62kg event at the 2022 Bolivarian Games held in Valledupar, Colombia.

Achievements

References

External links 
 

Living people
1997 births
Place of birth missing (living people)
Ecuadorian female sport wrestlers
Wrestlers at the 2014 Summer Youth Olympics
Pan American Wrestling Championships medalists
Competitors at the 2018 South American Games
Pan American Games competitors for Ecuador
Wrestlers at the 2019 Pan American Games
21st-century Ecuadorian women